Leszcz  (German Heeselicht) is a village in the administrative district of Gmina Dąbrówno, within Ostróda County, Warmian-Masurian Voivodeship, in northern Poland.

The village has a population of 230.

References

Leszcz